The Geisental Formation is a geologic formation in Germany. It preserves fossils dating back to the Jurassic period.

See also

 List of fossiliferous stratigraphic units in Germany

References
 

Jurassic Germany